Koninklijke Racing Club Zuid-West-Vlaanderen was a Belgian football club from the municipality of Harelbeke, West Flanders from 1930 to 2002.  It played one spell in the first division from 1995 to 2001.

At the end of the 2000–01 season, the club was relegated to the second division and it subsequently changed its name from K.R.C. Harelbeke to K.R.C. Zuid-West-Vlaanderen. The following year, the matricule n°1615 merged with K.S.V. Ingelmunster to become K.S.V. Ingelmunster-Zuid-West, a club now known again as KRC Harelbeke. The reason of the fusion was that Zuid-West-Vlaanderen went into liquidation after it was refused its license.

History
Racing Club Harelbeke was founded in 1930 and it registered the same year to the Belgian Football Association to become the matricule n°1615.  In 1955 the club changed its name to K.R.C. Harelbeke.  It appeared for the first time in the second division in 1978 and would eventually become a regular in that division, playing the final round four times before it won it in 1995.  Harelbeke achieved its best ranking with a 5th place in 1998 right behind Anderlecht.

Honours
Belgian Second Division Final Round:
Winners (1): 1995

References
 Belgian football clubs history
 RSSSF archive – 1st and 2nd division final tables

 
Association football clubs established in 1930
Defunct football clubs in Belgium
Association football clubs disestablished in 2002
1930 establishments in Belgium
2002 disestablishments in Belgium
Organisations based in Belgium with royal patronage
K.R.C. Zuid-West-Vlaanderen
Belgian Pro League clubs